Sentinel-3B is a European Space Agency Earth observation satellite dedicated to oceanography which launched on 25 April 2018. It was built as a part of the Copernicus Programme, and is the second (after Sentinel-3A, launched 16 February 2016) of four planned Sentinel-3 satellites.

Launch
Sentinel-3B was successfully launched on 25 April 2018 at 17:57 UTC from the Plesetsk Cosmodrome aboard a Rokot launch vehicle.

See also
Sentinel-3#Instruments

References

External links

 Sentinel-3 program website by ESA
 Sentinel-3 website by the Copernicus Programme
Real-time orbital tracking - uphere.space

Copernicus Programme
Earth observation satellites of the European Space Agency
Earth satellite radar altimeters
Spacecraft launched by Rokot rockets
Spacecraft launched in 2018
Oceanographic satellites